Housewrap (or house wrap), also known by the genericized trademark homewrap (or home wrap), generally denotes a modern synthetic material used to protect buildings. Housewrap functions as a weather-resistant barrier, preventing rain or other forms of moisture from getting into the wall assembly while allowing water vapor to pass to the exterior. If moisture from either direction is allowed to build up within stud or cavity walls, mold and rot can set in and fiberglass or cellulose insulation will lose its R-value due to heat-conducting moisture. House wrap may also serve as an air barrier if it is sealed carefully at seams.

Housewrap is a replacement for the older tar paper or asphalt saturated felt on walls. It is lighter in weight,  available in much wider rolls, and both faster and easier to apply.

Major types
 Micro-perforated, cross-lapped films
 Films laminated to spunbond nonwovens (Typar or CertaWrap)
 Films laminated or coated to polypropylene wovens
 Supercalendered, wetlaid polyethylene fibril nonwoven ("Tyvek")

Installation
Housewrap is installed between the sheathing and the exterior siding, and is utilized behind vinyl, wood clapboards, shingles or shakes, brick, and other building materials. In all cases, the housewrap helps prevent water intrusion when moisture in any form gets past the siding and its trim and caulking.

As such, housewrap must be both water shedding and have a high moisture vapor transmission rate (MVTR) to be effective. It must also withstand abuse during installation, hold up in significant winds while awaiting exterior siding installation, and, as housewrap is often left exposed for some time before being cladded-over, be resistant to UV. Some new designs must be installed carefully or they will slightly rip or tear during installation, possibly allowing for water infiltration at the damaged areas. Being both thin and inelastic, most newer designs do not "self-seal" well against nails or staples like asphalt products.

Properties
 Typical MVTR ~200 grams/100 square-inches/24hours (or greater, i.e., Tyvek is ~400)
 Typical 2 ounces/square-yard (varies greatly with manufacturer)
 Typical width 9' (108)" on a 3" core

References

Moisture protection
Building materials